The Trakker is a truck produced by Iveco for use in construction. It has a strong frame, off-road capability, different axles, and an optional all-wheel drive.

Motors 
The Trakker is powered by the Cursor engine family. Every engine uses selective catalytic reduction to meet European emission standards.

Axle ends and drive combinations 
Trakker Ivecos have been built in 4×2, 4×4, 6×4, 6×6, 8×4, and 8×8 configurations.

Gallery

References

External links 

 https://www.iveco.com/uk/products/pages/new-trakker-hi-reliability.aspx
 IVECO Trakker web site
  AD/AT 380 6x4 and  AD450 6x6 Specification sheets from IVECO

Trakker
Cab over vehicles